Leopold Israelsson (18 October 1934 – 15 October 1971) was a Swedish wrestler. He competed in the men's Greco-Roman middleweight at the 1960 Summer Olympics.

References

External links
 

1934 births
1971 deaths
Swedish male sport wrestlers
Olympic wrestlers of Sweden
Wrestlers at the 1960 Summer Olympics
People from Lycksele Municipality
Sportspeople from Västerbotten County
20th-century Swedish people